Karen Lis Nilheim (born 5 June 1944) is a Swedish actress. She won the award for Best Actress at the 11th Guldbagge Awards for her role in Maria. She has appeared in more than 45 films and television shows since 1964.

Selected filmography
 Äktenskapsbrottaren (1964)
 Maria (1975)
 Father to Be (1979)
 Du är inte klok, Madicken (1979)
 Madicken på Junibacken (1980)
 To Be a Millionaire (1980)
 Raskenstam (1983)

References

External links

1944 births
Living people
20th-century Swedish actresses
21st-century Swedish actresses
Swedish film actresses
Swedish television actresses
Actresses from Stockholm